Hwang Do-Yeon  (born 27 February 1991) is a South Korean footballer playing for Gimpo FC In the South Korean League K-League 2.

External links 
 

1991 births
Living people
South Korean footballers
Jeonnam Dragons players
Daejeon Hana Citizen FC players
Jeju United FC players
Seoul E-Land FC players
Asan Mugunghwa FC players
Suwon FC players
Hwang Do-yeon
K League 1 players
K League 2 players
Hwang Do-yeon
Association football defenders